Çallı (also, Chally) is a village and municipality in the Zardab Rayon of Azerbaijan.  It has a population of 2,265.

References 

Populated places in Zardab District